Stefan Sterath (born 15 January 1967) is a retired German football midfielder.

References

1967 births
Living people
German footballers
SV Sandhausen players
Borussia Dortmund players
SV Waldhof Mannheim players
Fortuna Düsseldorf players
Bundesliga players
2. Bundesliga players
Association football midfielders